The fourth and final season of the Australian drama television series Love Child, began airing on 2 May 2017 on the Nine Network. The season consisted of ten episodes airing on Tuesday evenings at 9:00 pm.

Cast

Main

 Jessica Marais as Joan Millar
 Mandy McElhinney as Matron Frances Bolton
 Harriet Dyer as Patricia Saunders
 Sophie Hensser as Viv Maguire
 Miranda Tapsell as Martha Tennant

Recurring

 Andrew Ryan as Dr Simon Bowditch
Dan Hamill as Dr Andrew Patterson 
Sophia Forrest as Debbie
Danielle Catanzariti as Elena 
Darcie Irwin-Simpson as Rita
Ronan Keating as Dr Lawrence Faber

Episodes

References

2017 Australian television seasons